Matsoku is a community council located in the Mokhotlong District of Lesotho. Its population in 2006 was 4,715.

Villages
The community of Matsoku includes the villages of Ha Hlolo, Ha Khosi, Ha Leohla, Ha Mafonyoko, Ha Makhabane, Ha Manyakane, Ha Meno, Ha Mokoto, Ha Molapo (Thepung), Ha Mosisi, Ha Nthele, Ha Phepheng, Ha Rachele, Ha Ralithebe, Ha Senkhane, Ha Thelelisane, Ha Tšekelo, Liseleng, Ha 'Makhoana,  K'hangela, Khubetsoana, Kutukutu, Ha Sekutlu, Lerakoaneng, Likhutlong, Linotšing, Liramong, Litenteng, Maboea, Mahonyeling, Makhapung, Makhoana, Masiteng, Ha Seshote, Ha 'Makhoana, Matsatsaneng, Mongobong, Mosifaneng, Ntširele, Pitseng, Postola, Sekhutlong, Khopung, Sekokoaneng and Thaba-Chitja.

References

External links
 Google map of community villages

Populated places in Mokhotlong District